Shigure Dam is an asphalt dam located in Tokyo prefecture in Japan. The dam is used for water supply. The catchment area of the dam is  km2. The dam impounds about 2  ha of land when full and can store 100 thousand cubic meters of water. The construction of the dam was completed in 1976.

References

Dams in Tokyo Prefecture
1976 establishments in Japan